Belpınar Dam is a dam in Tokat Province, Turkey. It was built between 1977 and 1984.

See also
List of dams and reservoirs in Turkey

External links
DSI

Dams in Tokat Province
Dams completed in 1984